Cem Sultan (born 27 February 1991) is a Turkish footballer who plays as a striker for the Circassian club Nart SK in the Amateur league.

References

External links
Statistics at TFF.org 
 

1991 births
Living people
Footballers from Istanbul
Association football forwards
Galatasaray S.K. footballers
Kayserispor footballers
Manisaspor footballers
Süper Lig players
Turkey under-21 international footballers
Turkey youth international footballers
TFF First League players
Turkish footballers